Mid-Continental Plaza is a 583 ft (178m) tall skyscraper in Chicago, Illinois. It was completed in 1972 and has 49 floors. Shaw and Associates designed the building, which is the 62nd tallest building in Chicago. It was originally planned as two 40-story black glass towers. The top 10 floors have been converted to condominiums called The Park Monroe.

See also
List of tallest buildings in Chicago

Position in Chicago's skyline

References
Emporis
Skyscraperpage
The Park Monroe

Residential skyscrapers in Chicago
Office buildings completed in 1972
Skyscraper office buildings in Chicago
Residential condominiums in Chicago
1972 establishments in Illinois